Common root rot may refer to:

Common root rot (barley)
Common root rot (wheat)
Root rot